Harold Hopkins may refer to:
Harold Hopkins (physicist) (1918–1994), British physicist
Harold Hopkins (actor) (1944–2011), Australian actor
Harold A. Hopkins Jr. (1930–2019), bishop of the Episcopal Diocese of North Dakota
Harold Hopkins, English politician, successful candidate in North Devon District Council election, 1999

See also
Harold Hopkins Miranda (born 1971), Puerto Rican musician
Harry Hopkins (disambiguation)